The Ehlers–Danlos Society is an international nonprofit organization dedicated to patient support, scientific research, advocacy, and increasing awareness for the Ehlers–Danlos syndromes (EDS) and hypermobility spectrum disorder (HSD). The society has organized multiple events around the world in an attempt to raise awareness for EDS and HSD. These events include a rally in Baltimore’s Inner Harbor, and a conference in India. The society also organizes symposiums dedicated to research on EDS and HSD. The 2016 symposium resulted in the reclassification of Ehlers–Danlos subtypes.

Logo 
The Ehlers–Danlos Society zebra logo is derived from a common expression heard in medicine, "When you hear hoofbeats behind you, don't expect to see a zebra." In other words, medical professionals are typically taught to look out for more-common ailments rather than uncommon or rare diagnoses. For the EDS and HSD community, they adopted the zebra because "sometimes when you hear hoofbeats, it really is a zebra." The Ehlers–Danlos Society is aiming "towards a time when a medical professional immediately recognizes someone with an Ehlers–Danlos syndrome or hypermobility spectrum disorder."

History 
The Ehlers–Danlos National Foundation (EDNF) was originally founded in 1985 by Nancy Rogowski. In 2013, they donated money to help fund the opening of a research center in Baltimore.

On May 1, 2016, the EDNF became The Ehlers–Danlos Society, a global organization.

Global Patient Registry 
The Ehlers–Danlos Society's EDS and HSD Global Registry and Repository enables the gene search for hypermobile EDS and facilitates research into the frequency of related symptoms and other conditions. It looks to map the experiences of those living with EDS and HSD, globally and discover new forms of EDS or HSD.

Leadership 
The President and CEO at The Ehlers–Danlos Society is Lara Bloom.

Board of Directors as of 2021 
 Sandra Aiken Chack
 Susan Hawkins, Chair
 John Zonarich, Esq., Vice Chair and Secretary
 Susan Haskel
 Elizabeth Herndon
 Linda Neumann-Potash
 Edward (Ward) J Fitzgerald III
 Woodrow Gandy, MD
 Melanie Macleod
 Amy Rochlin

Medical and Scientific Board 
 Fransiska Malfait, M.D., Ph.D., Chair
 Clair Francomano, M.D., Ph.D., Vice Chair
 Qasim Aziz, MBBS, FRCP, Ph.D.
 Peter Byers, M.D.
 Marco Castori, M.D., Ph.D.
 Heidi Collins, M.D.
 Raymond Dalgleish, Ph.D.
 Cecilia Giunta, Ph.D.
 Rodney Grahame CBE, M.D., FRCP, FACP, FRSA
 Alan Hakim, MA, FRCP
 Fraser Cummins Henderson Sr., M.D.
 Tomoki Kosho, M.D.
 Cathleen L. Raggio, M.D.
 Jane Simmonds, MCSP, MMACP, FHEA
 Glenda Sobey, MB ChB, BSc Med (Hons), FC Derm
 Brad Tinkle. M.D., Ph.D.

References

International medical and health organizations
International organizations based in the United States
Ehlers–Danlos syndrome
Charities based in Maryland
Organizations established in 2016
2016 establishments in the United States
Disability organizations based in the United States